Jänschwalde Power Station is located near the village of Jänschwalde in Brandenburg on the German-Polish border. The lignite-fired power station has an installed capacity of 3,000 megawatts and consists of six 500 MW units. It is the third-largest brown coal power plant in operation in Germany and is currently owned by EPH, who took over its ownership from Vattenfall in 2016.

Overview
The power station was built by VEB BMK Kohle und Energie (de) between 1976 and 1988. Between the German reunification and the mid-1990s, modern environmental technology was adopted, making higher energy efficiency possible. Despite this, the power station has the fifth-lowest ratio of energy efficiency to CO2 emission in Europe, according to a study by the WWF.

Jänschwalde power station predominantly fires raw brown coal from nearby open-pit mining in Jänschwalde and Cottbus to the north. At full load, the power station burns approximately 80,000 tons of brown coal a day. From one kilogram of brown coal about one kilowatt-hour of electrical energy is produced.

The yearly power output lies around 22 billion kWh (22 TWh).

The site formerly featured three obsolete  chimneys. These were gradually dismantled in a complex process between 2002 and 2007, as conventional demolition was not possible on the site for space reasons.

See also

 List of largest power stations in the world

Notes

Energy infrastructure completed in 1976
Towers completed in 1976
Energy infrastructure completed in 1989
Coal-fired power stations in Germany
Vattenfall
Towers in Germany
Buildings and structures in Spree-Neiße
Chimneys in Germany
Economy of Brandenburg
Energetický a průmyslový holding